Deutsche Rennsport Meisterschaft (translated as German Racing Championship) or simply DRM as it was known, was a touring car and Sportscar racing series. It is regarded as a predecessor of the current DTM as Germany's top national series.

History
In these years, the same or similar cars were also entered in the European Touring Car Championship.

Races were run separately as big Division 1 (for 2 to 4 liter) and small Division 2 (under 2 liter) in a sprint format.

In 1977, Group 5 cars were admitted into the series, making the series better supported with Gr.5 cars than the World Championship of Makes they were intended for. These fast and spectacular turbocharged cars with wide fenders and wings had many fans. Especially the Porsche 935 outpowered F1 cars. During common testing sessions at Circuit Paul Ricard, 935 passed them on the long Mistral straight.

In 1979, the Rennsport Trophäe (Racing Trophy) was introduced for the cheaper original series protagonists, the Group 2 and 4 cars. It consisted of combined races with the DRM until 1981.

In 1982, following the FIA rule changes, new Group C sportscars (along with existing Group 6) replaced the Group 5 machinery at the renamed International Deutsche Rennsport Meisterschaft. Meanwhile, the Rennsport Trophäe held separate races and events in 1982 and 1983, except for the 1982 ADAC Eifelrennen at the Nürburgring Nordschleife.

In 1984, with just three races held, organisers used three WEC (World Endurance Championship) races as additional IDRM point races. Also, the Rennsport Trophäe was replaced by the DPM (Deutsche Produktionswagen Meisterschaft), run with Group A cars.

1985 was the final year of the now called DSM, with just one race was held at Norisring, the rest of them held in conjunction with the popular Interserie. This meant CanAm entered from the latter series, as it had always been, had to be counted for points

The series would be replaced by the Group C-only Supercup in 1986. At that time, the less expensive DTM had taken over as Germany's most important racing series.

Since 2005 the AvD the AvD organizes a "Revival Deutsche Rennsportmeisterschaft" race at his great "Oldtimer Grand Prix".

Champions

References

External links
 http://www.research-racing.de/tw-d04.htm early DRM cars
 http://www.research-racing.de/tw-d05.htm Gr.5 DRM cars
 https://web.archive.org/web/20061022040646/http://schwede.de/motorsport_fotos/galerie/Revival_Deutsche_Rennsportmeisterschaft_OGP_2006  Pictures from the "Revival Deutsche Rennsportmeisterschaft" at the AvD Oldtimer Grand Prix 2006

Touring car racing series
Sports car racing series
Auto racing series in West Germany
1972 establishments in West Germany
1985 disestablishments in Germany
Defunct auto racing series
Defunct sports competitions in Germany